Mark Pearlman is a media executive, business and market strategist. In 2012 Mark Pearlman launched content marketing and publishing company Rethink Partners as well as an imprint for print and digital Jewish books called Sinai Live. In 2010 Pearlman joined Mitchell Eichen and The MDE Group, a New York City- and New Jersey-based wealth management firm, to launch an asset management unit and investment platform called Risk 3.0. The concept behind Risk 3.0 was articulated by Pearlman and Eichen in a March 2011 article in Financial Advisor Magazine titled the Five Commandments of Risk Management. Mark Pearlman advised Harvest USA which is a subsidiary of Harvest Fund Management- a China-based Asset Management firms with $100+ Billion in AUM. To build their USA brand and market position, Pearlman has been helping with business strategy, collaborative initiatives and marketing & communications activities.

Education 
Mark is a graduate of Brandeis University and the MIT Sloan School of Management. He attended Brookline High School in Brookline, Mass.

Career
Pearlman was part of the original executive team that launched the Fox News Channel under Roger Ailes in 1996. Previously, he held numerous management positions at CBS from 1978 to 1995 including Vice President, Business Development He also helped build a Metromedia Company owned by John Kluge, where he held the position of Vice President, Market Strategy.

In 2009 Pearlman cofounded 4Wall Media, with Yaakov (Jeffrey) Greenman, a private investment and media company. 4Wall is the parent company of JInsider, a Jewish media brand. Pearlman has authored three metric studies on the Jewish community through JInsider: "The Jewish GDP Study," "The Jewish Internet Metric Study" and "The Jewish Day School Study." He also produced and directed a documentary film through JInsider titled . The film highlighted spiritual wisdom for overcoming the pessimism and hopelessness following the financial collapse of 2008.

In addition, Pearlman was a columnist for The Jewish Week and has organized and sponsored a think-tank discussion with Jewish community leaders on the direction and goals of the community. In October 2012 his research on the "Jewish GDP" – a study on how philanthropic funds are spent in the Jewish community – was discussed at The Jewish People Policy Institute conference in Jerusalem and in November 2012 his recommendations on averting a "Jewish Fiscal Cliff" were published as op-eds in The Jewish Week and Jewish Journal. Sample columns from Pearlman include: Jewish Culturomics, Jewish Black Swan Events and Playing it Safe: The Jewish Third Rail Strategy.

Publishing
In 2012 Mark Pearlman launched content marketing and publishing company Rethink Partners as well as an imprint for Jewish books called Sinai Live. Rethink Partners books are available in print, text-only, and video-enhanced formats. Called "a modern mecca for Jewish literature," Sinai Live has published books by well known Jewish authors such as Rabbi Joseph Telushkin, Rabbi Benjamin Blech, the Rebbetzin Esther Jungreis, and others.

For Mother's Day, Sinai Live has published More Precious Than Pearls: A Prayer for the Women of Valor in Our Lives, a free collection of essays on Eishet Chayil, an ancient poem from the Book of Proverbs traditionally sung on Shabbat. For the High Holidays, Mark Pearlman has edited and published the enhanced e-book Connecting Moments , a collaboration with some of the world’s top Rabbis and teachers, who, in text and on film, share the secrets to transforming the High Holiday experience.

Sinai Live has also published Footsteps: Perspectives for Daily Life by the Rebbetzin Esther Jungreis, Passport to Kabbalah: A Journey of Inner Transformation by Rabbi DovBer Pinson, Insights: Concise and Thoughtful Jewish Wisdom by Rabbi Benjamin Blech, and The World from a Spiritual Perspective, a collection of Rabbi Blech's essays from Aish.com.

Risk 3.0
In 2010, Pearlman and Mitchell Eichen developed a framework to analyze investment risk called Risk 3.0. As a starting point, Risk 1.0 and Risk 2.0 describe the past evolutions of risk management that ultimately failed investors during the Financial crisis of 2007–2010. Risk 3.0 builds on these past approaches by incorporating dedicated capital preservation techniques as core strategy components, and better managing liquidity risk, credit risk, and transparency (fraud) risk. Through partnership with The MDE Group, Risk 3.0 was launched as a “risk-centric approach to investing that … addresses the current challenging investment environment.” Risk 3.0's investment solutions were subsequently covered in The Wall Street Journal in an article titled “A Focus on Preservation”, on CNBC in a segment titled "Risk First, Then Return." and in a variety of other financial and business publications.

Pearlman has also helped execute the launch of Risk 3.0 Asset Management as a provider of investment solutions for other wealth advisors. These solutions include Risk 3.0 Planned Return Strategy, Risk 3.0 Accelerated Return Strategy, and Risk 3.0 Third Rail Strategy, all of which use ETFs and publicly traded options to deliver a consistent pattern of returns for investors. Financial Advisor Magazine, InvestmentNews and AdvisorOne have all covered the launch of this platform of investment solutions.  Mark has since left the MDE Group to work with other organizations.

Philanthropy
Pearlman supports charitable causes and is directly involved with specific nonprofits. He is a former Chairman of the Children's Museum of Manhattan and was also a board member of the Annenberg Foundation initiative in New York City for the arts and education.

References

External links
Mark Pearlman homepage
Rethink Partners homepage
Pearlman Advisors homepage
JInsider homepage
Sinai Live homepage
Mark Pearlman in the NY Times Sunday Style section

American telecommunications industry businesspeople
American philanthropists
Jewish American philanthropists
Living people
Fox News people
American television executives
MIT Sloan School of Management alumni
Year of birth missing (living people)
21st-century American Jews